The 2014 Exeter City Council election took place on 22 May 2014, to elect members of Exeter City Council in Exeter, Devon, England. This was on the same day as other local elections.

Results summary

Results by ward

Alphington

Cowick

Duryard

Exwick

Heavitree

Mincinglake

Newtown

Pennsylvania

Pinhoe

Polsloe

Priory

St Davids

Whipton and Barton

References

2014 English local elections
2014
2010s in Exeter